KBSE-LD, UHF analog channel 33 (UHF digital channel 33), is a low-powered HSN-affiliated television station licensed to Boise, Idaho, United States. Founded July 21, 1992, the station is owned by Cocola Broadcasting. As of summer 2020, the station is using ATSC 3.0 and is one of two stations in Boise (the other being KEVA-LD) delivering Evoca, a over-the-air based subscription TV service. KBSE-LD is to transmit 20 encrypted channels, with KEVA-LD transmitting an additional 20.

See also
List of television stations in Idaho

References

External links
Cocola Broadcasting

BYU TV

BSE-LD
Television channels and stations established in 1998
1998 establishments in Idaho
Low-power television stations in the United States
ATSC 3.0 television stations